Melody Rules was a New Zealand sitcom created by Geoff Houtman and Mihera Paterson for TV3. It featured former Nightline host Belinda Todd as Melody, a hard-working sibling guardian surrounded by a gaggle of eccentric friends and family. The series was structured in a similar manner to an American sitcom, containing elements such as a laugh track and vaudeville-esque humour.

Although it ran for 40 episodes over two seasons in 1994-95, it was neither a critical nor commercial success. It has been named one of the worst sitcoms of all time.

Premise
Melody Rules centred on Melody Robbins (Belinda Todd), a conscientious and mild-mannered travel agent attempting to rein in her wayward siblings while her mother is off on an archaeological dig in Malaysia. She is aided and abetted by Fiona (Susan Brady), her ditzy air hostess best friend; Brendan (Alan Brough), her hapless co-worker; and Neville (Alistair Douglas), her nosey, filthy, and unkempt neighbour with the catchphrase "Ya decent?".

At the time, Todd was best known for her role as co-host of TV3's late news programme Nightline. She had little acting experience and was known more for her sexy, outrageous on-screen persona.

Production
Melody Rules was fledgling broadcaster TV3's first attempt at a sitcom, and it was hoped the show would form one of a number of flagship productions for the station. They received $1,262,990 funding from NZ on Air for production.

TV3 paid an American television writer, John Vorhaus, to hold workshops in New Zealand, teaching hopeful writers how to script an American-style sitcom. This influenced the style of Melody Rules.

List of episodes

Season 1
"Going, Going...Goner"
"Basic Insect"

Season 2
"Inside Job"
"We Are Family"
"The Devil You Know"
"Gullibles Travels"
"Double Scotch"

Reception

Critical reception
Critical reception for Melody Rules was poor, and it is considered in New Zealand to be one of the worst sitcoms of all time. It has also become part of the lexicon within the Kiwi television industry to describe an unsuccessful sitcom; for example, "That show will be the next Melody Rules." The series has been labelled as "cringeworthy" and "atrocious" by The New Zealand Herald, one of New Zealand television's "disasters" by Scoop, and "awful" by the Waikato Times.

Alan Brough and Belinda Todd both regret starring in the series; Todd compared it to Macbeth in terms of "bad luck", and described it as "absolutely ghastly." Brough described working on the series as "such a horrendous experience", adding "I was so embarrassed by it, I had to go overseas." Both Brough and Todd claim the series was substantial in convincing them to leave New Zealand and move to Australia and the United States, respectively. The series has developed a "certain cult status" for its perceived low quality. Despite this, Brough and Jodie Rimmer went on to lead fruitful acting careers, while Elliott O'Donnell is now known as Askew, a successful graffiti artist.

The failure of Melody Rules has been attributed to poor comedy writing, low budget production, miscast actors, and cultural incompatibility between the American-style sitcom and the comedy that New Zealanders prefer. In the years since Melody Rules, there have been no further American-style sitcoms produced in New Zealand.

Ratings
After being pulled from TV3's primetime scheduling due to poor ratings, the series was placed in an early-morning graveyard slot and "stripped" at two episodes per screening.

Cultural references
In 2019, a comedy podcast about the creation of the sitcom titled "The Worst Sitcom Ever Made" was released by Radio New Zealand. Episodes were presented by creator Geoff Houtman and featured interviews from the writing staff, crew and cast members.

References
Horrocks, Roger  & Nick Perry (2004). Television in New Zealand: Programming the Nation p23 Auckland, N.Z.: Oxford University Press.

External links
 Melody Rules at the Internet Movie Database
 Episode one of Melody Rules "Going, Going ... Goner"

1995 New Zealand television series endings
1994 New Zealand television series debuts
1990s New Zealand television series
New Zealand television sitcoms
Television shows funded by NZ on Air
Television shows set in Auckland
Three (TV channel) original programming